Valeria Flore is an Italian actress best known for her role as the adult Thea Adacher in the final scene of The Unknown Woman .

Life and career
She graduated in scenography at the Accademia di Belle Arti di Sassari after a course in Acting and diction at the acting school of Saverio Deodato debuted in the advertising world in 2003; at the cinema he debuted in 2006 in The Unknown Woman, directed by the director Giuseppe Tornatore, to then perform various roles in television series, soap operas and advertising.

Filmography

Films 
 2006 The Unknown Woman as old Thea Adacher 
 2007 Gadget Men as Sandra
 2009 Interferenze
 2013 Welcome Mr. President as Janis' sister
 2014 Do You See Me? as waitress
 2016 L'abbiamo fatta grossa as Head of collection center

TV series 
 2007 CentoVetrine as Camilla Ranieri
 2010 Il peccato e la vergogna as Contessina Arabella Casati
 2011 Viso d'angelo as Margherita Saltutti
 2013 Volare - La grande storia di Domenico Modugno as girl
 2017 È arrivata la felicità as Clelia
 2017 Un posto al sole as Francesca Savarese

References

External links
 

Italian actresses
Living people
Year of birth missing (living people)